Auzata simpliciata is a moth of the family Drepanidae first described by Warren in 1897. Its habitat is in northern India and the northern Yunnan province of China. and Taiwan.

References

Moths described in 1897
Drepaninae
Moths of Asia